Skeem Saam is a South African soap opera created by Winnie Serite, broadcast on SABC1 since 2011. The show is set in Johannesburg and Turfloop. It rose to fame since it arrived, competing with Generations. A majority youth-centered show, Skeem Saam is an SABC Education production. It has been running for 10 seasons. In January 2021, the SABC announced that the show would go on a production break starting from 1 March 2021 due to a massive decline in viewership.

Plot
The story follows the lives of the residents of Turfloop who face daily trials and tribulations as they climb the ladder to success. It also follows the lives of the rich in Johannesburg and how they handle the challenges they face in their businesses and also follows the lives of the rich and poor staying in Turfloop

Former Cast

Cast Shown on Opening Scene
Clement Maosa
Thabiso Mokolomme
Patrick Seleka JR
Putla Sehlapelo
Dieketseng Mnisi
Africa Tsoai
Harriet Manamela
Eric Macheru 
Cedric Fourie
Samukele Mkhize

Main Cast

References

South African television soap operas
SABC 1 original programming